Kahle is a surname. Notable people with the surname include:

 Brewster Kahle (born 1960), American internet entrepreneur and digital librarian
 Bronna Kahle (born 1968), American politician
 Danielle Kahle (born 1989), American figure skater
 James A. Kahle, IBM Fellow
 Manon Kahle (born 1980), American actress
 Paul E. Kahle (1875–1964), German orientalist
 Willy Kahle (born 1892), German flying ace

See also
 C. W. Kahles (1878–1931), German-born American cartoonist
 Kahless, fictional Klingon emperor
 Kahe (disambiguation)

Surnames
Surnames of German origin
German-language surnames